Dmitry Borisovich Larin (born 26 July 1973) is a Russian professional association football manager and a former player.

Playing career
He played 7 seasons in the Russian Football National League for FC Kristall Smolensk, FC Avangard Kursk and FC Dynamo Bryansk.

External links
 

1973 births
People from Nizhny Novgorod Oblast
Living people
Russian footballers
Association football defenders
FC Kristall Smolensk players
FC Dynamo Bryansk players
FC Zvezda Irkutsk players
FC Avangard Kursk players
Russian football managers
Sportspeople from Nizhny Novgorod Oblast